Ten ships of the Royal Navy have borne the name HMS Hardy, most of the later ones have been named for Vice Admiral Sir Thomas Masterman Hardy (1769–1839), captain of  during the Battle of Trafalgar:

  was a 12-gun gunvessel launched in 1797 and sold in 1802.
  was a 12-gun gun-brig launched in 1804. She was used as a storeship from 1818 and a hospital ship from 1821, before being sold in 1835.
  was a mortar vessel launched in 1855. She was renamed MV 12 later in 1855 and was sold in 1858.
  was an  wood screw gunboat launched in 1856 and sold in 1869.
She was launched in 1895 and sold in 1911.
  was an  launched in 1912 and sold for scrap in 1921.
  was an H-class destroyer launched in 1936 and sunk off Narvik in 1940.
  was a V-class destroyer launched in 1943 and damaged by the German submarine  in 1944, later being scuttled. 
  was a  ASW frigate launched in 1953 and sunk as a target in 1983.

See also: 

Royal Navy ship names